Haitong International Securities Group Limited known as Haitong International is a stock brokerage firm and investment bank based in Hong Kong, it is the first market maker from China at Nasdaq.

It was known as Tai Fook Securities which was owned by Chow Tai Fook–New World Development group until 2009.

History

Tai Fook Securities era
When the firm was known as Tai Fook Securities, it was accused that the firm lowered its commission below Stock Exchange of Hong Kong's minimum, by gifts from sister companies Chow Tai Fook Jewellery and New World Telephone in 1999.

Haitong International Securities Group era
Tai Fook Securities was then takeover by the Chinese firm Haitong Securities in 2009. Haitong Securities paid HK$1.82 billion to acquire the controlling stake of Tai Fook Securities from NWS Holdings. After the takeover, Tai Fook Securities was renamed to Haitong International Securities Group.

Haitong International is the first Chinese financial institution in Hong Kong to have been assigned a “BBB” long-term credit rating by Standard and Poor's. In November 2016 Haitong International Securities acquired Haitong Securities India from Haitong Bank, a sister company that formerly known as Banco Espírito Santo de Investimento.

References

External links
 
Financial services companies of Hong Kong
Financial services companies established in 1973
Chinese brands
1973 establishments in Hong Kong